Enteromius lauzannei is a species of ray-finned fish in the genus Enteromius which has only been recorded from the upper course of the River Lofa in Guinea.

References

 

Enteromius
Taxa named by Christian Lévêque
Taxa named by Didier Paugy
Fish described in 1982